Mr. Peabody and the Mermaid is a 1948 American romantic fantasy film directed by Irving Pichel starring William Powell and Ann Blyth in the title roles. The film was based on the 1945 novel Peabody's Mermaid by Guy and Constance Jones. Sequences were shot at the Weeki Wachee Springs in Florida.

Plot 
Much of the story is shown in flashback as Arthur Peabody tells a skeptical doctor about the source of his malaise.

After a bad bout of influenza, Peabody had gone on vacation with his wife Polly to the fictional Caribbean resort of St Hilda. While there, he hears singing coming from a rocky cay offshore and sails his boat to investigate and do a little fishing. To his embarrassment, he reels in a beautiful mermaid whom he names Lenore. Although mute, she is mischievous and childlike and more than a little alluring – so much so that before long Peabody has taught her to kiss. Meanwhile, he hides Lenore in the resort’s deep fish pond.

Confusion ensues as Peabody's wife Polly, who is herself attracted to suave Englishman Mike Fitzgerald, suspects her husband of infidelity with a vacationing singer. Things get more complicated after Polly storms off home without Peabody and police suspect him of murder. A search party pursues him to the cay, where Lenore nearly drowns Peabody by trying to conceal him underwater.

Back at home in Boston, as snow is falling, Peabody is talked into consulting Dr. Harvey and telling his story. In the end, Peabody seems to be persuaded by the doctor that he was hallucinating while undergoing a midlife crisis on the approach of his 50th birthday. There is only Lenore’s comb left to prove the reality of his adventure and this he gives to his wife as a homecoming gift.

Cast
 William Powell as Mr. Arthur Peabody
 Ann Blyth as Mermaid
 Irene Hervey as Mrs. Polly Peabody
 Andrea King as Cathy Livingston
 Clinton Sundberg as Mike Fitzgerald
 Art Smith as Dr. Harvey
 Hugh French as Major Hadley
 Lumsden Hare as Col. Mandrake
 Frederick Clarke as Basil 
 James Logan as Lieutenant 
 Mary Field as Wee Shop Clerk
 Beatrice Roberts as Mother 
 Cynthia Corley as Nurse
 Tom Stevenson as Charlie - Waiter
 Mary Somerville as Lady Trebshaw
 Dick Ryan Waiter (as Richard Ryan)
 Robert Hyatt as Little Boy (Bobby Hyatt)
 Ivan Browning as Sidney (as Ivan H. Browning)

Home media
The film was initially released by on DVD by ATI Corp, and was re-released by Olive Films (under license from Paramount Home Media Distribution) on DVD and Blu-ray on July 8, 2014.

Reception
The film is recognized by American Film Institute in these lists:
 2002: AFI's 100 Years...100 Passions – Nominated
 2008: AFI's 10 Top 10:
 Nominated Fantasy Film

See also 
Mermaids in popular culture

References

External links 

 
 
 

1948 films
1940s fantasy comedy films
1948 romantic comedy films
American black-and-white films
American romantic comedy films
American romantic fantasy films
American fantasy comedy films
Films based on American novels
Films directed by Irving Pichel
Films scored by Robert Emmett Dolan
Films set in Boston
Films set in the Caribbean
Films shot in Florida
Films about mermaids
Midlife crisis films
Films with screenplays by Nunnally Johnson
Universal Pictures films
1940s American films